Student Action (Azione Studentesca, AS) is a far-right student movement in Italy, formerly connected to National Alliance and since 2016 to Brothers of Italy.

History

1996–2009 
The movement was founded in 1996 by Youth Action (Azione Giovani, AS), the youth wing of National Alliance. Among the early members of the association was Giorgia Meloni, who would later become a prominent right-wing leader in Italy and eventually became Prime Minister of Italy in 2022.

The group gained notoriety when it occupied the headquarters of the Federation of Education Workers (FLC), a left-wing trade unions affiliated to the Italian General Confederation of Labour (CGIL).

After National Alliance merged with Forza Italia into The People of Freedom (PdL), Student Action was disbanded and its members joined the National Student Movement, affiliated to Young Italy, the youth wing of the PdL.

Relaunch in 2016 
Student Action was relaunched in 2016, this time affiliated with Brothers of Italy and its youth movement, the National Youth. The new group is considered to be much more radical than the original one, often openly supporting neo-fascist, the identitarian movement, and communitarian, and paternalistic conservative positions.

Symbol 
Student Action adapted a breton cross (a variant of the celtic cross) as its symbol in 2016.

References 

2016 establishments in Italy
Brothers of Italy
Identitarian movement
Italian nationalism
Neo-fascist organisations in Italy
Paternalistic conservatism
Student organisations in Italy